Forever Changes is the third studio album by the American rock band Love, released by Elektra Records in November 1967. The album saw the group embrace a subtler folk-oriented sound and orchestration, while primary songwriter Arthur Lee explored darker themes alluding to mortality and his creeping disillusionment with the 1960s counterculture. It was the final album recorded by the original band lineup; after its completion, Bryan Maclean left the group acrimoniously and the other members were dismissed by leader Lee.

Forever Changes had only moderate success in the album charts when it was first released in 1967; it peaked at No. 154 in the US, with a stronger showing in Great Britain, where it reached No. 24 on the UK album chart. In subsequent years, it became recognized as an influential document of 1960s psychedelia and was named among the greatest albums of all time by a variety of publications.

Background

In 1966, Love had released two albums in relatively rapid succession, including their second LP Da Capo, which spawned their only Top 40 hit, "7 and 7 Is". However, the group's opportunity for major national success dwindled as a consequence of frontman Arthur Lee's unwillingness to tour, his deteriorating relationship with Love's other songwriter Bryan MacLean, and the overshadowing presence of label-mates the Doors. In a 1992 interview, MacLean spoke of him and Lee "competing a bit like Lennon and McCartney to see who would come up with the better song. It was part of our charm. Everybody had different behaviour patterns. Eventually, the others couldn't cut it". Throughout this period the band – reduced to a quintet with the departures of Alban "Snoopy" Pfisterer and Tjay Cantrelli – were known to retreat to a dilapidated mansion in Hollywood, nicknamed "The Castle", where the group became further stagnated by their use of heroin. The band was allowed to live in this mansion as long as they did the maintenance and paid the taxes.  According to author John Einerson, the rumor of it being formerly lived in by Bela Lugosi is a myth.

Inspiration
Rather than base his writings on Los Angeles's burgeoning hippie scene, Lee's material for Forever Changes was drawn from his lifestyle and environment. The songs reflected upon grim but blissful themes and Lee's skepticism of the flower power movement.
Writer Andrew Hultkrans explained Lee's frame of mind at the time: "Arthur Lee was one member of the '60s counterculture who didn't buy flower-power wholesale, who intuitively understood that letting the sunshine in wouldn't instantly vaporize the world's (or his own) dark stuff". Love's third studio album also brought about a sense of urgency for Lee. With his band in disarray and growing concerns over his own mortality, Lee envisioned Forever Changes as a lament to his memory.

Having already produced the group's first two albums, Bruce Botnick was enlisted in overseeing the production of the third album along with Lee. Botnick, who had just finished working on Buffalo Springfield's Buffalo Springfield Again, invited Neil Young to co-produce the upcoming Love album, but Young, after initially agreeing, excused himself from the project. As Botnick recalled "Neil really had the burning desire to go solo and realize his dream without being involved in another band". According to the liner notes in the compilation album Love Story, Young was involved in Forever Changes long enough to arrange the track "The Daily Planet". Young, however, has denied such involvement.

The title of the album came from a story that Lee had heard about a friend-of-a-friend who had broken up with his girlfriend. She exclaimed, "You said you would love me forever!" and he replied, "Well, forever changes." Lee also noted that since the name of the band was Love, the full title was actually Love Forever Changes.

Recording
According to AllMusic, the band embraced "a more gentle, contemplative, and organic sound on Forever Changes," with much of the album "built around interwoven acoustic guitar textures and subtle orchestrations, with strings and horns both reinforcing and punctuating the melodies." Elektra Records founder Jac Holzman had suggested that Love "advance backwards" by embracing the more subtle approach of folk music, and Lee—while typically independent in his musical directions—accepted Holzman's suggestion, setting the foundational approach to the Forever Changes recording sessions. Pitchfork stated that Lee paired his "dark, discomfiting lyrics" with music that draws from rock, psychedelia, folk, pop, classical, and even mariachi music, but which is not reducible to these influences.

Love started recording Forever Changes in June 1967 at Sunset Sound Recorders. However, beginning with the early recording sessions, the band, except Lee, was plagued by internal conflicts and lack of preparation for Lee's intricate arrangements.  Through Holzman's perspective, Botnick was an "album savior", guiding and motivating Lee's bandmates out of their trying period. To compel the band to participate, Botnick enlisted top session musicians, the Wrecking Crew's Billy Strange (guitar), Don Randi (piano), Hal Blaine (drums), and Carol Kaye (bass guitar) to work with Lee, completing the sessions for two songs in one day: "Andmoreagain" and "The Daily Planet". Shocked by the implications of losing their role in the album's development, Botnick's plan succeeded in motivating the Love members in recording the other nine tracks appearing on Forever Changes.

Lee spent three weeks with David Angel, the arranger of the strings and horns, playing and singing the orchestral parts to him. Lee envisioned the horns and strings from the beginning, and they were not added as an afterthought. A September 25 recording session finished the album, adding the horns and strings, as well as some additional piano from Randi, who played all the keyboard parts on the album as the band now had no keyboard player.

Release and reception

Initial release
Upon its release in late 1967, Forever Changes was only moderately successful commercially. It peaked at No. 154 in 1968, which was the lowest showing of Love's first three albums. Forever Changes had a much stronger showing in Great Britain, where it reached No. 24 on the UK album chart in 1968.

Initial reviews were positive. Writing for Rolling Stone in 1968, Jim Bickhart regarded Forever Changes as Love's "most sophisticated album yet", applauding the orchestral arrangements and recording quality. In Esquire, Robert Christgau said it is an elaboration on Love's original musical style and "a vast improvement" over their previous recordings, because "Lee has stopped trying to imitate Mick Jagger with his soft voice, and the lyrics, while still obscure, now have an interesting surface as well." Pete Johnson of the Los Angeles Times believed the album "can survive endless listening with no diminishing either of power or of freshness", adding that "parts of the album are beautiful; others are disturbingly ugly, reflections of the pop movement towards realism". Gene Youngblood of LA Free Express also praised the album, calling it "melancholy iconoclasm and tasteful romanticism."

Retrospective acclaim

In a retrospective review, AllMusic stated that despite the album's initial mixed reception, "years later it became recognized as one of the finest and most haunting albums to come out of the Summer of Love," calling it "an album that heralds the last days of a golden age and anticipates the growing ugliness that would dominate the counterculture in 1968 and 1969." The 1979 edition of The Rolling Stone Record Guide gave the album a rating of five stars (out of five). It also received five stars in the 1983 edition of the guide and in the 1992 guide four. In a special issue of Mojo magazine, Forever Changes was ranked the second greatest psychedelic album of all time. In the January 1996 issue, Mojo readers selected Forever Changes as number 11 on the "100 Greatest Albums Ever Made". Forever Changes was praised by a group of members of the British Parliament in 2002 as being one of the greatest albums of all time.

Reissues
Forever Changes was included in its entirety on the 2-CD retrospective Love compilation Love Story 1966–1972, released by Rhino Records in 1995. The album was re-released in an expanded single-CD version by Rhino in 2001, featuring alternate mixes, outtakes and the group's 1968 single, "Your Mind and We Belong Together"/"Laughing Stock", the final tracks ever to feature the Forever Changes line-up of Arthur Lee, Johnny Echols, Ken Forssi, Michael Stuart-Ware and Bryan MacLean (Forssi and MacLean both died in 1998).

The Forever Changes Concert was released on DVD in 2003 and marked the first time many of the songs had been performed live. The set features the entire album performed in its original running order, recorded in early 2003 during Lee's tour of England, in which he was backed by the band Baby Lemonade and members of the Stockholm Strings 'n' Horns ensemble. The DVD features the album concert, five bonus performances, documentary footage and an interview with Lee.

A double-CD "Collector's Edition" of the album was issued by Rhino Records on April 22, 2008. The first disc consists of a remastered version of the original 1967 album. The second disc contains a previously unissued alternate stereo mix of the album, plus ten bonus tracks.

A Super High Material CD (SHM-CD) version of Forever Changes was released by Warner Music Japan in 2009, and a 24 bit 192 kHz High Resolution version of the album was released by HDTracks in 2014, and in the same year a hybrid Super Audio CD (SACD) version of the album was released by Mobile Fidelity Sound Lab.

A 50th anniversary deluxe edition box set was released by Rhino on April 6, 2018, featuring four CDs, a DVD and an LP. It contains remastered versions of the stereo, mono and alternate stereo mixes of the album, a disc of demos, outtakes, alternate mixes and non-album tracks, a DVD containing a 24/96 stereo mix of the album and a bonus music video, and a new LP remaster of the album, remastered by Bruce Botnick and cut from high resolution audio by Bernie Grundman.

Legacy
In 2008, the album was inducted into the Grammy Hall of Fame and in 2011, the album was added to the National Recording Registry. Rolling Stone ranked it number 180 on its 2020 list of the 500 Greatest Albums of All Time. The album was also included in Robert Christgau's "Basic Record Library" of 1950s and 1960s recordings, published in Christgau's Record Guide: Rock Albums of the Seventies (1981). It was voted number 12 in Colin Larkin's All Time Top 1000 Albums 3rd Edition (2000). In 2013, NME ranked the album number 37 on their list of The 500 Greatest Albums of All Time. Publishers such as AllMusic and Slant Magazine have praised the album as well. In a 2005 survey held by British television's Channel 4, the album was ranked 83rd in the 100 greatest albums of all time. The album was included in the 2005 book 1001 Albums You Must Hear Before You Die.

According to the New Musical Express, the Stone Roses' relationship with their future producer John Leckie was settled when they all agreed that Forever Changes was the "best record ever". Robert Plant is an admirer of the album.

Track listing
All songs written by Arthur Lee, except "Alone Again Or" and "Old Man" which are written by Bryan MacLean. Details are taken from the 50th Anniversary Edition.

2001 Rhino bonus tracks

A single disc collection, presenting the original stereo album, remastered, plus the following bonus tracks:

2008 Rhino "Collector's Edition" bonus tracks

A two-disc collection. Disc 1 presents the original stereo album, remastered, while disc 2 is a previously unreleased alternate stereo mix of the album, featuring the following bonus tracks:

2018 "50th Anniversary Edition" bonus discs

A box set comprising four CDs, one LP and one DVD: disc 2 presents the original mono album, remastered; disc 3 is the alternate stereo mix; disc 4 is outtakes, single versions, demos, session highlights and non album tracks from the era; disc 5 is the original stereo album on vinyl, remastered and cut from high resolution audio; and disc 6 is a 24/96 stereo mix on DVD, featuring a bonus music video.

Personnel
According to the 2001 reissue CD booklet.

Love
 Arthur Lee – guitar, vocal
 Bryan MacLean – guitar, vocal
 Johnny Echols – guitar
 Ken Forssi – bass 
 Michael Stuart-Ware – drums, percussion

Additional musicians
 Carol Kaye – bass guitar on "Andmoreagain" and "The Daily Planet"
 Don Randi – keyboards on "Andmoreagain" and "The Daily Planet"; piano on "Old Man" and "Bummer in the Summer"; harpsichord on "The Red Telephone"
 Billy Strange – electric rhythm guitar on "Andmoreagain" and "The Daily Planet"
 Hal Blaine – drums on "Andmoreagain" and "The Daily Planet"
 Neil Young – arranger on "The Daily Planet"
 David Angel – arranger, orchestrations
 Strings – Robert Barene, Arnold Belnick, James Getzoff, Marshall Sosson, Darrel Terwilliger (violins); Norman Botnick (viola); Jesse Ehrlich (cello); Chuck Berghofer (string bass)
 Horns – Bud Brisbois, Roy Caton, Ollie Mitchell (trumpets); Richard Leith (trombone)

Production and design

See also
Timeline of 1960s counterculture

References

External links
Inside the National Recording Registry segment

Love (band) albums
1967 albums
Albums produced by Bruce Botnick
Elektra Records albums
Grammy Hall of Fame Award recipients
Rhino Records albums
Albums produced by Arthur Lee (musician)
United States National Recording Registry recordings
Baroque pop albums
Psychedelic folk albums
Psychedelic rock albums by American artists
Albums recorded at Sunset Sound Recorders
United States National Recording Registry albums